The Governor Thomas G. Jones House is a historic Victorian-style house in Montgomery, Alabama.  The two-story frame building was built in 1855.  It is best known as Governor Thomas G. Jones Mansion, Alabama's 28th Governor.  It was added to the National Register of Historic Places on December 8, 1978.

References

Houses on the National Register of Historic Places in Alabama
Houses completed in 1855
Victorian architecture in Alabama
National Register of Historic Places in Montgomery, Alabama
Houses in Montgomery, Alabama